Kelly David Miller (born March 3, 1963) is an American former professional ice hockey winger who played in the National Hockey League between 1985 and 1999 with the New York Rangers and Washington Capitals.

Early life 
Miller was born in Lansing, Michigan. He is one of ten members of his extended family to play hockey at Michigan State University for the Spartans men's ice hockey team.

Career
Miller began his NHL career with the New York Rangers during the 1984–85 season. He was traded to the Washington Capitals during the 1986–87 season in a trade that sent former first-round pick Bobby Carpenter to the Rangers. From 2001 to 2003 he served as an assistant coach with the New York Islanders.

In April 2011, Miller was named assistant coach of the MSU hockey team, joining former teammate Tom Anastos who was given the head coaching position earlier in the year.

Personal life 
Miller's brothers, Kevin and Kip, also played in the (NHL). His cousins are former NHL goaltender Ryan Miller and Ryan's brother Drew Miller.

Career statistics

Regular season and playoffs

International

Awards and honors

See also
Notable families in the NHL
List of NHL players with 1000 games played

References

External links

Living people
1963 births
American men's ice hockey left wingers
Anaheim Ducks coaches
Grand Rapids Griffins (IHL) players
Ice hockey players from Michigan
Michigan State Spartans men's ice hockey players
New York Islanders coaches
New York Rangers draft picks
New York Rangers players
Sportspeople from Lansing, Michigan
Washington Capitals players
AHCA Division I men's ice hockey All-Americans